Liosbel Hernández (born December 17, 1983) is a Cuban rower. He and Raúl Hernández placed 18th in the men's lightweight double sculls event at the 2016 Summer Olympics.

References

1983 births
Living people
Cuban male rowers
Olympic rowers of Cuba
Rowers at the 2016 Summer Olympics
Pan American Games medalists in rowing
Pan American Games gold medalists for Cuba
Pan American Games bronze medalists for Cuba
Rowers at the 2015 Pan American Games
Medalists at the 2011 Pan American Games
Medalists at the 2015 Pan American Games
21st-century Cuban people